This is a list of members of the Tasmanian House of Assembly between the 25 March 1916 election and the 31 May 1919 election. At the 1916 election, no party won a majority, and the Liberals' Walter Lee became Premier of Tasmania. During the term, the Liberal Party converted into the new Nationalist Party, and the Labor Party split over conscription. However, most of the Parliamentary Labor Party stayed with the executive, and the two MHAs who left the Party switched to federal politics. The state of flux, however, resulted in four seats switching from Labor to Nationalist at by-elections and recounts.

All members listed here as Nationalists who held office prior to 1917 were previously known as Liberals.

Notes
  Nationalist (formerly Labor) MHA for Franklin, John Earle, resigned on 1 March 1917, and on the same day was appointed to a vacancy in the Australian Senate. Nationalist  candidate and former MHA Arthur Cotton was elected on 14 April 1917.
  Nationalist (formerly Liberal) MHA William Burgess died on 1 May 1917. Nationalist candidate George Foster was elected on 23 June 1917.
  The 5 May 1917 federal election resulted in several MHAs resigning to contest seats. Labor MHAs Walter Woods and James Belton attempted to secure Australian Senate seats, whilst Labor MHA Benjamin Watkins attempted to win the Denison seat and Nationalist (formerly Labor) MHA Charles Howroyd won Darwin. On 7 July 1917, their seats went to by-election, with Belton returning, Watkins being replaced by Nationalist candidate Percy Pollard, Woods by Nationalist candidate Charles Hoggins, and Howroyd with Nationalist (formerly Labor) candidate James Newton.
  Nationalist MHA for Wilmot, Edward Mulcahy, retired in January 1919. Nationalist candidate William Connell was elected on 16 January 1919.

Sources
 
 Parliament of Tasmania (2006). The Parliament of Tasmania from 1856

Members of Tasmanian parliaments by term
20th-century Australian politicians